Waller is a census-designated place (CDP) in Columbia County, Pennsylvania, United States.  It is part of Northeastern Pennsylvania. The population was 48 at the 2010 census. It is part of the Bloomsburg-Berwick micropolitan area.

History
Waller was called "Polksville" until the late 19th century. Historically, there was a church and a post office in Waller.

Geography
Waller is located in northern Columbia County at  (41.229077, -76.422059), in the east center of Jackson Township.

Waller's terrain consists mostly of hills. The land is roughly split between forest and farmland. Green Creek, a tributary of Fishing Creek, rises in Waller. The CDP is not served directly by any major roads.

Demographics
As of the census of 2000, there were 55 people, 26 households, and 17 families residing in the CDP. The population density was 43.7 people per square mile (16.9/km). There were 33 housing units at an average density of 26.2/sq mi (10.1/km). The racial makeup of the CDP was 100.00% White.

There were 26 households, out of which 15.4% had children under the age of 18 living with them, 57.7% were married couples living together, and 30.8% were non-families. 23.1% of all households were made up of individuals, and 15.4% had someone living alone who was 65 years of age or older. The average household size was 2.12 and the average family size was 2.44.

In the CDP, the population was spread out, with 14.5% under the age of 18, 5.5% from 18 to 24, 23.6% from 25 to 44, 30.9% from 45 to 64, and 25.5% who were 65 years of age or older. The median age was 48 years. For every 100 females, there were 83.3 males. For every 100 females age 18 and over, there were 80.8 males.

The median income for a household in the CDP was $36,875, and the median income for a family was $40,000. Males had a median income of $32,500 versus $12,083 for females. The per capita income for the CDP was $18,827. None of the population and none of the families were below the poverty line.

References

Bloomsburg–Berwick metropolitan area
Census-designated places in Columbia County, Pennsylvania
Census-designated places in Pennsylvania